Valjala is a small borough in Saare County, Estonia, on the island of Saaremaa. It is the administrative centre of Saaremaa Parish. As of 2011 Census, the settlement's population was 410.

The Valjala St. Martin's Church lies in centre of Valjala and is the oldest stone church in Estonia. Ruins of Valjala Stronghold are about 700 meters south from Valjala.

References

Boroughs and small boroughs in Estonia
Saaremaa Parish